Sri Sri Mayapur Chandrodaya Mandir or the Temple of the Vedic Planetarium, also called ISKCON Mayapur, is a Gaudiya Vaishnava  temple and the headquarters of ISKCON, located in Mayapur, West Bengal, India. The temple is dedicated to Hindu deities Radha Madhava. Construction of the temple was started in 2010 and when completed it will be the world's largest Vaishnava temple and one of the tallest temples. Located  from Kolkata, it was originally aimed to be completed in the year 2022, however delay in construction due to the COVID-19 pandemic may push the opening date to somewhere in late 2023.

History

Background 
Sri Sri Maya Chandrodaya Mandir is inspired by the vision of ISKCON founder Srila Prabhupada and the design of the United States Capitol building. In July 1976, Srila Prabhupada expressed his preference for the exterior style of the temple. Accordingly, the ISKCON authorities started construction of the temple.

Construction 
The construction of the temple started in 2010.

Delays 
The construction of the temple was expected to be completed in 2016. Unfortunately, the construction of the temple was not completed in 2016 due to construction delays. It was further delayed due to COVID-19 pandemic. As of now, the temple is anticipated to open for visitors between July and August 2023.

Architecture 
The temple is a blend of eastern and western architecture. Height of this temple is 113 meters. When fully completed, this temple will be world’s largest religious monument or largest temple in the world and the second tallest temple or religious building.

See also 
Vrindavan Chandrodaya Mandir

Notes

References 

2010 establishments in West Bengal
International Society for Krishna Consciousness temples
Hindu temples in West Bengal
Hindu temples in Nadia district
21st-century Hindu temples